Plettenberg Bay Aerodrome  is a small airport serving Plettenberg Bay, a town in the Western Cape province in South Africa.

Airlines and destinations

See also 
 List of airports in South Africa

References

External links
 Aerodrome chart by CAA
 
 
 

Airports in South Africa
Transport in the Western Cape
Garden Route District Municipality